Boon Thau Loo is a Singaporean-American computer scientist, college administrator, and technology entrepreneur. He is currently the RCA professor in the Computer and Information Science department at the University of Pennsylvania where he leads a research lab working on distributed systems, and serves as the Associate Dean for Graduate Programs at the University of Pennsylvania School of Engineering and Applied Science.

Early life
Boon Thau Loo was born in Malaysia and grew up in Singapore. He studied at The Chinese High School and Raffles Junior College. In 1996, he moved to the United States in order to attend the University of California, Berkeley, where he received an undergraduate degree in Electrical Engineering and Computer Science. Following his studies there, he pursued his master's degree in computer science at Stanford University. He then returned to Berkeley for his PhD, which he graduated in 2006 with the David J. Sakrison Memorial Prize dissertation award and the 2007 ACM SIGMOD Dissertation Award for his thesis The Design and Implementation of Declarative Networks. Following his studies, Loo began working as a post-doctoral researcher at Microsoft Research.

Academic career
As a scholar, Loo became the RCA professor of artificial intelligence at the University of Pennsylvania in the departments of Computer and Information Science and Electrical and Systems Engineering. At Penn he is also the director of the Distributed Systems Laboratory and the NetDB@Penn research group. In 2018, he became the associate dean of master's and professional programs, where he oversees all Master's and professional programs in the School of Engineering and Applied Science. As associate dean, Loo led several new academic initiatives, such as MCIT Online, first Ivy League fully online master's degree program in computer science for non-computer science majors, the J.P. Eckert Diversity Fellowship, Cybersecurity boot camp for mid-career professionals in the Philadelphia greater area, data science boot camp, the accelerated master's program for Penn undergraduates., professional development course for all master's students in engineering, and MSE-DS Online (online Data Science master's).

While serving as a researcher and professor, Loo has founded several private enterprises. He has published over 150 papers and two books - Declarative Networking (Synthesis Lectures on Data Management) in 2012 and Datalog and Recursive Query Processing (Foundations and Trends(r) in Databases) in 2013.

In 2019, Loo received the University of Pennsylvania Emerging Inventor of the Year award, given annually to one Penn faculty member for success in technology transfer..

In July 2020, Loo was appointed Associate Dean for Graduate Programs, where he oversees all doctoral, master's and professional programs at Penn Engineering. As graduate dean, he launched several new initiatives, including the Dean's Doctoral Diversity Fellowship, Dean's Master's Fellowships for on-campus and online master's students, and the Master-to-Ph.D. bridge program.

In 2021, Loo received the 2021 Ruth and Joel Spira Award for Excellence in Teaching, sponsored by Lutron Electronics

Business career
While on sabbatical leave from Penn in 2014, Loo cofounded and led Gencore Systems, a Penn startup company on cloud performance monitoring. Gencore Systems was one of the first faculty-led startups from Penn's Computer Science department. Leading a group of his former students that spun off the company with him, Loo formed a partnership with the OpenLab of Juniper Networks and integrated his group's research on high-performance declarative network analytics into Juniper's newly acquired Contrail SDN platform. The company raised seed funding in addition to a SBIR (Small Business Innovative Research) grant from the National Science Foundation. The company was later renamed Netsil and acquired by Nutanix in 2018 for up to US$74M in stock. At the point of acquisition, Netsil was one of the first successful faculty-led startup exits from the University of Pennsylvania's School of Engineering and Applied Science.

In 2015, Loo also cofounded Termaxia, a big data storage company, where he served as Chief Scientist. In 2020, the company was acquired by Frontiir, a leading Internet company in Southeast Asia. Post acquisition, Loo currently serves as the executive adviser at Frontiir, where he advises the CEO and CTO on technology strategy, and help establish Frontiir's R&D center in Philadelphia.

Recognition
 
 Lindback award for Distinguished Teaching, awarded by the University of Pennsylvania, 2022
 Best paper award at the 23rd International Conference on Extending Database Technology, 30th March-2nd April, 2020
 Air Force Office of Scientific Research Young Investigator Program award, 2012
 ACM SIGMOD Dissertation Award, 2007
 David J. Sakrison Memorial Prize, 2006
 Computing Research Association Outstanding Undergraduate Awards (Honorable mention), 1999

References

Living people
University of Pennsylvania faculty
Stanford University alumni
UC Berkeley College of Engineering alumni
Computer scientists
Malaysian company founders
Malaysian non-fiction writers
People from Singapore
Technology writers
Computer science writers
Technology company founders
Year of birth missing (living people)